Constantine (stylized as Cons♰antįne) is an American occult detective drama television series developed by Daniel Cerone and David S. Goyer for NBC. Based on the DC Comics character of the same name, it stars Matt Ryan as the eponymous John Constantine, an English exorcist and occult detective who hunts supernatural entities. The series premiered on October 24, 2014, and aired for one season, concluding on February 13, 2015.

Although the series was canceled after its first season, Ryan would reprise his role in the Arrowverse franchise, which retroactively established Constantine as part of the same continuity. Ryan also returned as Constantine in the DC Animated Movie Universe and its animated spin-off series Constantine: City of Demons.

Premise
John Constantine, a demon hunter and dabbling master of the occult, must struggle with his past sins while protecting the innocent from the converging supernatural threats that constantly break through to our world due to the "Rising Darkness". Balancing his actions upon the line of good and evil, Constantine uses his skills and a supernatural scry map to journey across the nation to send these terrors back to their own world, all for the hope of redeeming his soul from eternal torment.

Cast and characters

Main
 Matt Ryan as John Constantine: Enigmatic and irreverent, formerly a con man, now a reluctant supernatural detective.
 Lucy Griffiths as Liv Aberdine. Griffiths was cast as a series regular for the pilot; however, she was written out of the series when production on further episodes began.
 Angélica Celaya as Mary "Zed" Martin: A psychic artist who finds Constantine intriguing enough to follow him on his exorcisms.
 Charles Halford as Francis "Chas" Chandler: Constantine's oldest friend and staunch companion, who possesses powerful survival skills.
 Harold Perrineau as Manny: An authoritative angel assigned to watch over Constantine.

Recurring
 Michael James Shaw as Papa Midnite
 Bailey Tippen as Astra Logue
 Jeremy Davies as Ritchie Simpson
 Emmett J. Scanlan as Jim Corrigan
 Jonjo O'Neill as Gary "Gaz" Lester

Guest
 Elyse DuFour as Nora
 Charles Parnell as Nommo
 Mark Margolis as Felix Faust
Robert Crayton as EMT Worker
 Skyler Day as Miranda
 Claire van der Boom as Anne Marie
 David A. Gregory as Eddie
 Juliana Harkavy as Sarah
 Tracy Fisher as Nurse Brad

Episodes

On October 30, 2015, Daniel Cerone released a script for the fourteenth episode, titled "Final Girl", which would have aired if the series had not been canceled.

Production

Development
The series was developed by Daniel Cerone and David S. Goyer, with the pilot episode directed by Neil Marshall. The on-screen depiction of Constantine's chain-smoking habit was said to be curtailed because of broadcast television restrictions (the network eventually becomes more lenient and John is shown smoking on screen in later episodes). Additionally, the character's bisexuality was not referenced on screen, with Cerone saying, "In those comic books, John Constantine aged in real time. Within this tome of three decades [of comics] there might have been one or two issues where he's seen getting out of bed with a man. So [maybe] 20 years from now? But there are no immediate plans". This was met with criticism from the LGBTQ community.

Griffiths was cast as the original female lead Liv Aberdine, the daughter of a late friend of John's called Jasper Winters, who comes to discover that she has the ability of seeing the supernatural world among us. She teams up with Constantine to fight the demons who have targeted her and learn more about her late father. Griffiths was dropped after Goyer and Cerone decided to take the series in a different creative direction. The comic character Zed was chosen as a replacement for the female lead. Angélica Celaya was later announced to fill the role. Some of Griffiths' final scenes from the pilot were reshot, explaining why she does not join Constantine in his adventures as originally intended. Both Goyer and Cerone have talked about a possible return for Liv.

Cancellation
In November 2014, NBC announced that they would not be ordering more episodes past the initial order of 13 for the first season, though a second season renewal was not ruled out. When questioned about the chances of the series return in January 2015, NBC president Jennifer Salke said, "We wish the show would've done better live. It has a big [delayed] viewership and a younger audience. We love the show and it's safe to say we're still talking about it". NBC entertainment chairman Robert Greenblatt added, "We got on the comic books bandwagon. Maybe, there are too many of them". In February 2015, Cerone reconfirmed that the series had not been cancelled and that the producers would pitch their ideas for an additional season to NBC in May 2015. In mid-April 2015, Cerone stated it was "a long shot" that the series would be renewed, adding "While we marginally improved a tough time slot for NBC, we're a very expensive show to produce. A lot of NBC's decision making will not doubt hinge on their new pilots and how they feel those new shows would fare as a companion piece to Grimm, versus a second season of Constantine". On April 23, Cerone tweeted that the producers would pitch their ideas for a second season on April 27, which was earlier than he had previously announced in February, with NBC making their decision in early May. Following the meeting, Cerone tweeted that the "NBC exec said [to] tell the fans it went well" and that "If this show comes back for more, I can honestly say it was the fans".

On May 8, 2015, NBC declined to renew the series for a second season, prompting Warner Bros. Television to shop the series around in an attempt to get it picked up by another network. A month later, Cerone revealed that the cast and crew were released from their contracts after Warner Bros. Television had "tried to find a new home for the show... but those efforts didn't pan out", and stated "that the show is over". On the many fans who voiced their support for the series in attempting to get it renewed, Cerone said, "we're leaving behind wild and passionate fans who believe in and were moved by what we tried to do. To leave such a significant, dedicated and active fan base on the table—that's the real sadness. You all deserve many years of the series we set out to make, and we're disappointed that we couldn't deliver that to you".

Release

Broadcast
Constantine aired simultaneously on Global in Canada. In the United Kingdom, the series was acquired by Amazon Video. The series is available to stream in Australia on Stan. It is also available in Canada on Shomi starting September 24, 2015. On July 1, 2016, the series was made available to stream on CW Seed.

Home media
The complete series, along with bonus material, was released on Blu-ray, DVD and digitally on October 4, 2016 by the Warner Archive Collection.

Reception

Critical response
The review aggregator website Rotten Tomatoes reported a 72% critic approval rating with an average rating of 6.2/10 based on 46 reviews. The website's consensus reads, "Constantines creepy atmosphere, high-stakes action, and splendid special effects combine with a welcome touch of humor to overcome narrative flaws and present a version of the title character that's close to his comics counterpart". Metacritic, which uses a weighted average, assigned a score of 53 out of 100 based on 25 reviews, indicating "mixed or average reviews".

Kylie Peters of Den of Geek, reviewing the pilot episode, said "Constantine is worth sticking around for. It may not have achieved greatness yet, but it's not half bad either". Matt Fowler of IGN gave the pilot episode "Non Est Asylum" a 7.5/10, praising Matt Ryan's performance as Constantine saying that the episode is a good set up for the series, but criticized the pacing. Reviewing the entire season, Fowler again praised Ryan's performance, described the season as engaging, and praised the adaptations of arcs from the comics ("A Feast of Friends", "The Saint of Last Resorts" and "Waiting for the Man"), but criticized the episode shifting and team members randomly disappearing. Ultimately, Fowler called the season uneven and awarded it a 7.2/10. Jonathan Bernstein of The Telegraph gave the pilot episode 2 stars out of 5, calling it "an endurance test". He criticized Lucy Griffiths performance, saying that "unless she was being bribed to kill the show stone dead like an old-time boxer paid to take a fall, there's no way she could have been worse in the part", but praised Ryan, saying that he "brought a certain gravelly charm to the role".

Ratings
 
The premiere episode "Non Est Asylum" received an additional 2.90 million viewers from DVR viewing, to create a total of 7.14 million viewers for the episode.

Accolades

Spin-offs and related shows

John Con Noir
DC Entertainment released a clay stop motion animation web series called John Con Noir. The web series was developed by Cool Town Creations to support the petition for the television series to be renewed for a second season. The first chapter was released on January 16, 2015 on the DC Comics official website and YouTube account, in addition to the mid-season premiere on NBC.

Arrowverse

In May 2015, Stephen Amell, who portrays Oliver Queen / Green Arrow on The CW's Arrow, revealed he had discussions with DC Entertainment to portray the character on the show, saying, "The reason that I was going to guest star on Constantine, at least the idea that we were throwing around was [Constantine's] an expert when it comes to the Lazarus Pit, which is now something that is a part of and will continue to be a part of Arrow". Additionally, Arrow showrunner Marc Guggenheim revealed a desire to integrate Constantine into the universe that had been created with Arrow, saying, "A lot of the pieces are in place, except for that one final piece, which is what's the fate of Constantine? That's the tricky thing. But it comes up in the writers' room constantly—we have a number of ideas, one idea that's particularly exciting to me. We're in a little bit of a wait-and-see mode". In July 2015, additional Arrow showrunner Wendy Mericle added, "We really want to [include Constantine]. It's something we've been talking to DC about and it's just a question of some political things, but also the actor's schedule. We're trying to work it out, but we don't know 100 percent if it's going to happen. But we're really optimistic and we would love to have him", presumably talking about Matt Ryan.

In August 2015, it was confirmed that Ryan would appear on Arrow in the fourth season episode "Haunted", that involved his character being "brought in to deal with the fallout of the resurrection of Sara Lance (Caity Lotz) via Ra's al Ghul's Lazarus Pit". Guggenheim said, "This is something the fans were clamoring for", praising DC for being so "magnanimous and generous in giving us this one-time dispensation". John Badham, who directed the fifth episode of Constantine, "Danse Vaudou", directed the Arrow episode. In addition, Mericle revealed that the version of Constantine that Matt Ryan portrayed on Arrow is the same version of the character that was portrayed on Constantine, therefore retroactively establishing the two shows in a shared universe. On filming the episode, Guggenheim stated it felt like the production team was "doing a Constantine/Arrow crossover, and it's so exciting... We're just really glad we got the chance to extend Matt Ryan's run as Constantine by at least one more hour of television. I think you'll see he fits very neatly into our universe. It never feels forced, it feels right".

It was revealed in October 2017 that Ryan would appear in two episodes of the third season of Legends of Tomorrow, with the appearance taking place chronologically after "Haunted", revisiting the setting of Arrows fourth season and the events following that season's final episode. Bailey Tippen also reprised her role as Astra Logue from Constantine for a brief voiceover in “Necromancing the Stone”. After the positive reception of his appearance in Legends of Tomorrow, The CW announced that Ryan would appear in the season finale, and later, it was announced ahead of the series' renewal for a fourth season that Ryan's role as Constantine would be upgraded to series regular. Olivia Swann took over the role of Astra, guest starring in the fourth season before becoming a series regular in the fifth season. Ryan left the role of Constantine in the sixth season, and portrayed a new character, Dr. Gwyn Davies, in the final season.

Animated web series

In January 2017, the animated web-series Constantine was announced, for The CW Seed, with Ryan returning to voice the character. CW President Mark Pedowitz noted there had yet to be discussions regarding if any other characters that appeared in the cancelled live-action series to appear in the web series, nor if this version of the character would "connect back to the live action storylines he's been a part of". Greg Berlanti, Sarah Schechter and Goyer serve as executive producers and Butch Lukic serves as producer. J.M. DeMatteis wrote the series, which was directed by Dough Murphy. The series premiered on March 24, 2018.

See also
 Constantine (film)

References

External links

 
2014 American television series debuts
2015 American television series endings
2010s American drama television series
2010s American horror television series
2010s American supernatural television series
Occult detective fiction
Television shows based on DC Comics
Television series by Warner Bros. Television Studios
Television shows filmed in Atlanta
Television series created by David S. Goyer